Governor Martin may refer to:

Alexander Martin (1740–1807), 4th & 7th Governor of North Carolina
Charles Martin (Oregon politician) (1863–1946), 21st Governor of Oregon
Clarence D. Martin (1886–1955), 11th Governor of Washington
Daniel Martin (politician) (1780–1831), 20th Governor of Maryland
Edward Martin (Pennsylvania politician) (1879–1967), 32nd Governor of Pennsylvania
François Martin (Pondicherry) (1634–1706), 1st Governor General of Pondicherry
James G. Martin (born 1935), 70th Governor of North Carolina
Jesse M. Martin (1877–1915), Acting Governor of Arkansas in 1909
John Martin (Governor of Georgia) (died 1786), 12th Governor of Georgia
John Martin (Governor of Kansas) (1839–1889), 10th Governor of Kansas
John W. Martin (1884–1958), 24th Governor of Florida
Joshua L. Martin (1799–1856), 12th Governor of Alabama
Josiah Martin (1737–1786), 9th British Governor of the Province of North Carolina from 1771 to 1776
Noah Martin (1801–1863), 23rd Governor of New Hampshire
Robert Martin (Oklahoma governor) (1833–1897), Acting Governor of Oklahoma Territory from 1891 to 1892

See also
Manuel António Martins (1772–1845), Colonial Governor of Cape Verde and Portuguese Guinea from 1834 to 1835